Too Hot to Die (formerly known as That Night) is a 2018 South Korean comedy film directed by Park Jin-young. It was previously set to be released in August 2018, before being pushed to October 18, 2018.

Premise 
Three men and a woman who claim their lives are the saddest in the world decide to end their lives at the same time together. But the plan doesn’t go as it should, as their shocking pasts start to be revealed.

Cast
Kim In-kwon as Byung-nam
Jung Sang-hoon as Shim-sun
Son Dam-bi as Mi-ji
Kim Sung-cheol as Doo-seok
Park Chul-min as Kwang-ki
Shin Hyun-joon (special appearance)
Tak Jae-hoon (special appearance)

Production 
Principal photography began on March 3, 2018, and wrapped on April 2, 2018.

Release
The film was released on October 18, 2018, alongside Hollywood films First Man and A.X.L..

References

External links
 
 Too Hot to Die at Naver

2018 films
2018 comedy films
South Korean comedy films
2010s South Korean films